Kalampur is a town in the Dharamgarh sub-division of the Kalahandi district in India's Odisha State.

References

Cities and towns in Kalahandi district